Toni Finsterbusch (born 14 June 1993 in Leipzig) is a German Grand Prix motorcycle racer. He currently competes in the IDM Superbike Championship aboard a Suzuki GSX-R1000. He has also competed in the Moto3 World Championship, the FIM CEV Moto2 International Championship, the European Superstock 1000 Championship, the European Superstock 600 Championship, the ADAC Junior Cup and the German IDM 125 Championship, finishing as runner-up in both championships, in 2007 and 2010 respectively.

Career statistics

By season

Races by year
(key) (Races in bold indicate pole position)

References

External links

1993 births
Living people
German motorcycle racers
125cc World Championship riders
Moto3 World Championship riders
FIM Superstock 1000 Cup riders
Sportspeople from Leipzig